Spoon & Pork is a restaurant specializing in Filipino cuisine. First opened as a food truck in 2017, its main location is presently located at 3131 Sunset Boulevard in the Silver Lake neighborhood of Los Angeles.

History
Spoon & Pork was opened in April 2017 by Ray Yaptinchay and Jay Tugas, childhood friends from the Philippines who both later moved to the United States. Initially launching as a food truck, neither Yaptinchay nor Tugas had any experience in the restaurant industry when they first opened.

In late 2018, after developing a loyal following and looking to expand, the restaurant announced that would open a permanent location in Silver Lake, which would largely serve the same menu as the food truck. Initially scheduled to open in February 2019, the permanent location opened in July of that year.

A second branch of Spoon & Pork opened on 2121 Sawtelle Boulevard in the Sawtelle neighborhood in October 2021.

Location and concept

Spoon & Pork's main Silver Lake branch currently occupies a  space along Sunset Boulevard which also includes a modestly-sized minimalist dining room, modern in design with tropical-themed walls, and an outdoor patio space slightly detached from the rest of the street. In addition to its in-house operation, the restaurant is also a fixture at Smorgasburg's Los Angeles iteration.

The restaurant's space is in a building that is shared with Diablo Tacos, a prominent Silver Lake taco restaurant. The building, owned by nightclub owner Steve Edelson, also previously hosted long-time Mexican restaurant La Parrilla, which closed in October 2011.

Spoon & Pork's menu, with both Yaptinchay and Tugas equally sharing cooking duties at the restaurant, has been described as being "modern Filipino comfort food", informed by the owners' love of cooking at home despite their lack of formal culinary training. Pork cooked in various ways dominates the restaurant's offerings, which include takes on lechon kawali (served as an appetizer) and the chori burger. Its signature dish, the patita, is the restaurant's take on crispy pata and is large enough for up to three people, served with a sweet chili and garlic sauce. Braised for up to 15 hours and subsequently air-dried for an additional 24 hours before being put in the fryer, and originally served with a popsicle stick as a means of eating the dish, the patita has been described as being rich and flavorful, and has been instrumental in building its following.

Although it primarily serves pork, Spoon & Pork also serves other meats, as well as vegan dishes, which include a jackfruit dish that was named by The New York Times as one of its top ten dishes in Los Angeles for 2019.

Awards and accolades
Spoon & Pork has been identified by the Los Angeles Times as part of a growing number of Los Angeles-based modern Filipino restaurants, helping raise the profile of Filipino cuisine both in the city and nationally. A few months after opening in 2017, LA Weekly readers named it the best food truck in Los Angeles, and in 2020, the Los Angeles Times named it as one of the city's 101 best restaurants for that year.

References

External links

2017 establishments in California
Filipino-American culture in California
Philippine cuisine
Restaurants established in 2017
Restaurants in Los Angeles
Silver Lake, Los Angeles